A leadership election was held by the Likud party on 19 December 2005. former Prime Minister and Party Leader Benjamin Netanyahu defeated Deputy Prime Minister and Minister of Foreign Affairs Silvan Shalom, as well as candidates Moshe Feiglin and Israel Katz.

Background 
The previous leader of the Likud was Ariel Sharon, then the Prime Minister of Israel. Sharon was elected to the leadership of the Likud in September 1999, following Benjamin Netanyahu's resignation, and to the Premiership in 2001. Sharon was subsequently re-elected as leader in 2003, defeating Netanyahu, and won the general election held later that year. Sharon appointed Netanyahu as the Minister of Finance in March 2003.

That year, Sharon made plans for a unilateral disengagement from the Gaza Strip. The plan faced significant opposition from within the Likud. in a party referendum held in May 2004, 59.5% of voting members opposed the plan, while 39.7% supported it. Turnout stood at 51.6% of all registered members of the Likud. The plan was then rejected a second time by the party's central committee, and subsequently went to a vote in the Knesset in October, where several members of the Likud, including Netanyahu, conditioned the implementation of the plan on a national referendum. They subsequently backed down, allowing the vote to be passed in an event later known as the "Night of the Rabbits". After the cabinet voted to begin the disengagement process in August 2005, Netanyahu resigned as Minister of Finance. Shortly thereafter, Uzi Landau announced his intention to run for the party's leadership.

In November 2005, Sharon resigned from the leadership of the Likud and as prime Minister and founded a new party, Kadima. he was joined by members of the Likud and Labor, including Shimon Peres, who was ousted as leader of the Labor party several weeks prior. Following Sharon's resignation, Tzachi Hanegbi, who served as chairman of the Likud's central committee, became the party's interim leader, and President Moshe Katsav scheduled a new election for March 2006. On 24 November, the central committee announced the first round of the leadership election would be held on 19 December, with a potential second round scheduled for 26 December. Netanyahu formally announced his intention to run that same day, Silvan Shalom did so on 29 November, and Moshe Feiglin did on 30 November. Israel Katz and Shaul Mofaz also announced their intention to run.

Hanegbi left the Likud and joined Kadima on 7 December, and was provisionally replaced by a council of five Likud ministers led by Minister of Health Dan Naveh, and additionally including Education Minister Limor Livnat, as well as Gideon Sa'ar, Michael Eitan and Likud Director General Arik Brami.

Campaign 
Netanyahu campaigned on his financial and security policies, emphasizing his tenure as the Minister of Finance, and his opposition to Sharon's disengagement plan, criticizing the new Kadima party and referring to them as "Labor B". following Landau's withdrawal from the race, Netanyahu stated that he would seek to recruit qualified candidates to the party's electoral list ahead of the general election. the day before the primary was held, he argued that he was the most electable candidate, and further criticized Sharon and Labor leader Amir Peretz for their financial policies and positions on the Israeli–Palestinian conflict.

Shalom campaigned against Mofaz and Netanyahu, arguing that he was more electable. he additionally advocated for peace talks with the Palestinians, and criticized Netanyahu's economic policies.

Feiglin's campaign attempted to appeal to secular voters. He ran on a platform he referred to as 'Family, Education, Security and Justice'. aiming to preserve traditional family values, provide tax exemptions to married couples, include studies of Jewish history and identity in the national curriculum, withdraw from the Oslo Accords and impose Israeli sovereignty on the West Bank. he additionally proposed that the Likud form an electoral list with smaller right-wing parties.

Landau campaigned on his opposition to the disengagement plan, and like Feiglin, proposed the formation of an electoral list between the Likud and smaller right-wing parties, before withdrawing from the race on 5 December and endorsing Netanyahu.

He additionally pledged to keep the Likud in Sharon's government until after the 2006 election. Mofaz later withdrew from the race, left the Likud and joined Kadima on 11 December.

Candidates 

 Benjamin Netanyahu, Member of the Knesset, former Prime Minister of Israel and Leader of the Likud, former Minister of Finance
 Silvan Shalom, Member of the Knesset, former Minister of Finance, Minister of Foreign Affairs and Deputy Prime Minister
 Moshe Feiglin, leader of Manhigut Yehudit
 Israel Katz, Member of the Knesset and Minister of Agriculture and Rural Development

Withdrawn 

 Uzi Landau, Member of the Knesset and former Minister of Public Security (endorsed Netanyahu)
 Shaul Mofaz, Member of the Knesset and Minister of Defense

Results 
128,347 Members of the Likud were eligible to vote.

Aftermath 
Silvan Shalom conceded the election after initial results showed a Netanyahu victory. Feiglin expressed satisfaction with the results, arguing they indicated significant growth in his support within the Likud. following the primary, all remaining Likud Ministers resigned from the government by the end of January 2006. on 4 January, Ariel Sharon suffered a stroke that left him in a permanent coma until his death in 2014. he was replaced as Prime Minister by Ehud Olmert, who led the party through the general election in March.

The Likud won 12 seats in the March election, less than a third of the 38 seats the party won in 2003. following the election, Olmert formed a new government, which did not include the Likud. Netanyahu was re-elected as leader of the Likud in 2007, and later won the 2009 election, which resulted in him forming a government and becoming the Prime Minister.

References

Notes 

Likud leadership elections
Benjamin Netanyahu
2005 political party leadership elections
December 2005 events in Asia